Amantine Lucile Aurore Dupin de Francueil (1 July 1804 – 8 June 1876), best known by her pen name George Sand, was a French novelist, memoirist and journalist. One of the most popular writers in Europe in her lifetime, being more renowned than either Victor Hugo or Honoré de Balzac in England in the 1830s and 1840s, Sand is recognised as one of the most notable writers of the European Romantic era, with more than 50 volumes of various works to her credit, including tales, plays and political texts, alongside her 70 novels.

Like her great-grandmother, Louise Dupin, whom she admired, George Sand stood up for women, advocated passion, castigated marriage and fought against the prejudices of a conservative society.

Personal life

Childhood
Amantine Aurore Lucile Dupin, the future George Sand, was born on 1 July 1804 in Paris on Meslay Street to Maurice Dupin de Francueil and Sophie-Victoire Delaborde. She was the paternal great-granddaughter of the Marshal of France Maurice de Saxe (1696-1750), and on her mother's side, her grandfather was Antoine Delaborde, master paulmier and master birder. She was raised for much of her childhood by her grandmother Marie-Aurore de Saxe, Madame Amantine Aurore Lucile Dupin de Francueil, at her grandmother's house in the village of Nohant, in the French province of Berry. Sand inherited the house in 1821 when her grandmother died, and used the setting in many of her novels.

Male Attire

Sand was one of many notable 19th-century women who chose to wear male attire in public. In 1800, the police issued an order requiring women to apply for a permit in order to wear male clothing. Some women applied for health, occupational, or recreational reasons (e.g., horseback riding), but many women chose to wear pants and other traditional male attire in public without receiving a permit.

Sand was one of those women who wore men's clothing without a permit, justifying it as being less expensive and far sturdier than the typical dress of a noblewoman at the time. In addition to being comfortable, Sand's male attire enabled her to circulate more freely in Paris than most of her female contemporaries and gave her increased access to venues that barred women, even those of her social standing. Also scandalous was Sand's smoking tobacco in public; neither peerage nor gentry had yet sanctioned the free indulgence of women in such a habit, especially in public, although Franz Liszt's paramour Marie d'Agoult affected this as well, smoking large cigars.

While some contemporaries were critical of her comportment, many people accepted her behaviour—until they became shocked with the subversive tone of her novels. Those who found her writing admirable were not bothered by her ambiguous or rebellious public behaviour. 

Victor Hugo commented, "George Sand cannot determine whether she is male or female. I entertain a high regard for all my colleagues, but it is not my place to decide whether she is my sister or my brother."

In 1831, at the age of twenty-seven, she chose her pseudonym George Sand, a feminine of the first name Georges unknown until then, and added "Sand", a diminutive of "Sandeau", the name of Jules, her lover at the time. This decision came from a desire to sow confusion about her identity and thus increase her chances of being published in a then resolutely male publishing world.

Notable relationships

In 1822, at the age of eighteen, Sand married (François) Casimir Dudevant, an out-of-wedlock son of Baron Jean-François Dudevant. She and Dudevant had two children: Maurice and Solange (1828–1899). In 1825, she had an intense but perhaps platonic affair with the young lawyer Aurélien de Sèze. In early 1831, she left her husband and entered upon a four- or five-year period of "romantic rebellion". In 1835, she was legally separated from Dudevant and took custody of their children.

Sand had romantic affairs with the novelist Jules Sandeau (1831), the writer Prosper Mérimée, the dramatist Alfred de Musset (summer 1833 – March 1835), Louis-Chrysostome Michel, the actor Pierre-François Bocage, the writer Charles Didier, the novelist Félicien Mallefille, the politician Louis Blanc, and the composer Frédéric Chopin (1837–1847). Later in her life, she corresponded with Gustave Flaubert, and despite their differences in temperament and aesthetic preference, they eventually became close friends.

Sand also engaged in an intimate romantic relationship with actress Marie Dorval. The two met in January 1833, after Sand wrote Dorval a letter of appreciation following one of her performances. Sand wrote about Dorval, including many passages where she is described as smitten with Dorval. Only those who know how differently we were made can realize how utterly I was in thrall to her...God had given her the power to express what she felt...She was beautiful, and she was simple. She had never been taught anything, but there was nothing she did not know by instinct. I can find no words with which to describe how cold and incomplete my own nature is. I can express nothing. There must be a sort of paralysis in my brain which prevents what I feel from ever finding a form through which it can achieve communication...When she appeared upon the stage, with her drooping figure, her listless gait, her sad and penetrating glance...I can say only that it was as though I were looking at an embodied spirit. 

Theater critic Gustave Planche reportedly warned Sand to stay away from Dorval. Likewise, Count Alfred de Vigny, Dorval's lover from 1831 to 1838, warned the actress to stay away from Sand, whom he referred to as "that damned lesbian". In 1840, Dorval played the lead in a play written by Sand, titled Cosima, and the two women collaborated on the script. However, the play was not well-received, and was cancelled after only seven showings. Sand and Dorval remained close friends for the remainder of Dorval's lifetime.

Relationship with Chopin 
Sand spent the winter of 1838–1839 with Chopin in Mallorca at the (formerly abandoned) Carthusian monastery of Valldemossa. The trip to Mallorca was described in her Un hiver à Majorque (A Winter in Majorca), first published in 1841. Chopin was already ill with incipient tuberculosis at the beginning of their relationship, and spending a cold and wet winter in Mallorca where they could not get proper lodgings exacerbated his symptoms. 

Sand and Chopin also spent many long summers at Sand's country manor in Nohant from 1839 to 1846, skipping only 1840. There, Chopin wrote many of his most famous works, including the Fantaisie in F minor, Op. 49, Piano Sonata No. 3, Op. 58, and the Ballade No. 3 Op. 47.

In her novel Lucrezia Floriani, Sand is said to have used Chopin as a model for a sickly Eastern European prince named Karol. He is cared for by a middle-aged actress past her prime, Lucrezia, who suffers greatly through her affection for Karol. Though Sand claimed not to have made a cartoon out of Chopin, the book's publication and widespread readership may have exacerbated their later antipathy towards each other. After Chopin's death, Sand burned much of their correspondence, leaving only four surviving letters between the two. Three of the letters were published in the "Classiques Garnier" series in 1968.

Another breach was caused by Chopin's attitude toward Sand's daughter, Solange. Chopin continued to be cordial to Solange after she and her husband Auguste Clésinger fell out with Sand over money. Sand took Chopin's support of Solange to be extremely disloyal, and confirmation that Chopin had always "loved" Solange.

Sand's son Maurice disliked Chopin. Maurice wanted to establish himself as the "man of the estate" and did not wish to have Chopin as a rival. Maurice removed two sentences from a letter Sand wrote to Chopin when he published it because he felt that Sand was too affectionate toward Chopin and Solange. 

Chopin and Sand separated two years before his death for a variety of reasons. Chopin was never asked back to Nohant; in 1848, he returned to Paris from a tour of the United Kingdom, to die at the Place Vendôme in 1849. George Sand was notably absent from his funeral.

In December 1849 Maurice invited the engraver Alexandre Manceau to celebrate Christmas in Nohant. George Sand fell passionately in love with Manceau, he became her lover, companion and secretary and they stayed together for fifteen years until his death.

Last years and death 

George Sand had no choice but to write for the theater because of financial difficulties. In Nohant, she even exercised the functions of village doctor, having studied anatomy and herbal remedies with a Doctor Deschartres. But she was not confined to Nohant, and travelled in France, and in particular with her great friend Charles Robin-Duvernet at the Château du Petit Coudray, or abroad. In 1864, Sand took residence in Palaiseau together with her beloved Manceau for a couple of months, where she tended him in his decline.

Sand died at Nohant, near Châteauroux, in France's Indre département on 8 June 1876, at the age of 71. She was buried in the private graveyard behind the chapel at Nohant-Vic. In 2003, plans that her remains be moved to the Panthéon in Paris resulted in controversy.

Career and politics 

Sand's first literary efforts were collaborations with the writer Jules Sandeau. They published several stories together, signing them Jules Sand. Sand's first published novel Rose et Blanche (1831) was written in collaboration with Sandeau. She subsequently adopted, for her first independent novel, Indiana (1832), the pen name that made her famous – George Sand.

By the age of 27, Sand was Europe's most popular writer of either gender, more popular than both Victor Hugo and Honoré de Balzac in England in the 1830s and 1840s, and she remained immensely popular as a writer throughout her lifetime and long after her death. Early in her career, her work was in high demand; by 1836, the first of several compendia of her writings was published in 24 volumes. In total, four separate editions of her "Complete Works" were published during her lifetime. In 1880, her children sold the rights to her literary estate for 125,000 Francs (equivalent to 36 kg worth of gold, or 1.3 million dollars in 2015 USD).

Drawing from her childhood experiences of the countryside, Sand wrote the pastoral novels La Mare au Diable (1846), François le Champi (1847–1848), La Petite Fadette (1849), and Les Beaux Messieurs de Bois-Doré (1857). A Winter in Majorca described the period that she and Chopin spent on that island from 1838 to 1839. Her other novels include Indiana (1832), Lélia (1833), Mauprat (1837), Le Compagnon du Tour de France (1840), Consuelo (1842–1843), and Le Meunier d'Angibault (1845).

Theatre pieces and autobiographical pieces include Histoire de ma vie (1855), Elle et Lui (1859, about her affair with Musset), Journal Intime (posthumously published in 1926), and Correspondence. Sand often performed her theatrical works in her small private theatre at the Nohant estate.

Political views 
Sand also wrote literary criticism and political texts. In her early life, she sided with the poor and working class as well as championing women's rights. When the 1848 Revolution began, she was an ardent republican. Sand started her own newspaper, published in a workers' co-operative.

Politically, she became very active after 1841 and the leaders of the day often consulted with her and took her advice. She was a member of the provisional government of 1848, issuing a series of fiery manifestos. While many Republicans were imprisoned or went to exile after Louis-Napoléon Bonaparte's coup d’état of December 1851, she remained in France, maintained an ambiguous relationship with the new regime, and negotiated pardons and reduced sentences for her friends.

Sand was known for her implication and writings during the Paris Commune of 1871, where she took a position for the Versailles assembly against the communards, urging them to take violent action against the rebels. She was appalled by the violence of the Paris Commune, writing, "The horrible adventure continues. They ransom, they threaten, they arrest, they judge. They have taken over all the city halls, all the public establishments, they’re pillaging the munitions and the food supplies."

Criticism 

Sand's writing was immensely popular during her lifetime and she was highly respected by the literary and cultural elite in France. Victor Hugo, in the eulogy he gave at her funeral, said "the lyre was within her."

Eugène Delacroix was a close friend and respected her literary gifts. Flaubert was an unabashed admirer. Honoré de Balzac, who knew Sand personally, once said that if someone thought she wrote badly, it was because their own standards of criticism were inadequate. He also noted that her treatment of imagery in her works showed that her writing had an exceptional subtlety, having the ability to "virtually put the image in the word." Alfred de Vigny referred to her as "Sappho".

Not all of her contemporaries admired her or her writing: poet Charles Baudelaire was one contemporary critic of George Sand: "She is stupid, heavy and garrulous. Her ideas on morals have the same depth of judgment and delicacy of feeling as those of janitresses and kept women ... The fact that there are men who could become enamoured of this slut is indeed a proof of the abasement of the men of this generation."

Influences on literature 

Fyodor Dostoevsky "read widely in the numerous novels of George Sand" and translated her La dernière Aldini in 1844, only to learn that it had already been published in Russian. In his mature period, he expressed an ambiguous attitude towards her. For instance, in his novella Notes from Underground, the narrator refers to sentiments he express as, "I launch off at that point into European, inexplicably lofty subtleties à la George Sand". 

The English poet Elizabeth Barrett Browning (1806–61) wrote two poems: "To George Sand: A Desire" (1853) and "To George Sand: A Recognition". The American poet Walt Whitman cited Sand's novel Consuelo as a personal favorite, and the sequel to this novel, La Comtesse de Rudolstadt, contains at least a couple of passages that appear to have had a very direct influence on him.

In addition to her influences on English and Russian literature, Sand's writing and political views informed numerous 19th century authors in Spain and Latin America, including Gertrudis Gómez de Avellaneda, the Cuban-born writer who also published and lived in Spain. Critics have noted structural and thematic similarities between George Sand's Indiana, published in 1832, and Gómez de Avellaneda's anti-slavery novel Sab, published in 1841. 

In the first episode of the "Overture" to Swann's Way—the first novel in Marcel Proust's In Search of Lost Time sequence—a young, distraught Marcel is calmed by his mother as she reads from François le Champi, a novel which (it is explained) was part of a gift from his grandmother, which also included La Mare au Diable, La Petite Fadette, and Les Maîtres Sonneurs. As with many episodes involving art in À la recherche du temps perdu, this reminiscence includes commentary on the work.

Sand is also referred to in Virginia Woolf's book-length essay A Room of One's Own along with George Eliot and Charlotte Brontë as "all victims of inner strife as their writings prove, sought ineffectively to veil themselves by using the name of a man."

Frequent literary references to George Sand appear in Possession (1990) by A. S. Byatt and in the play Voyage, the first part of Tom Stoppard's The Coast of Utopia trilogy (2002). George Sand makes an appearance in Isabel Allende's Zorro, going still by her given name, as a young girl in love with Diego de la Vega (Zorro).

George Sand, Chopin and her children are the main characters of the debut novel Briefly, A Delicious Life (2022) by British writer Nell Stevens. The book tells the story of a teenage ghost, Bianca, who falls in love with George Sand when she moves with her family and Chopin to a former Carthusian monastery in Valldemossa, in the miserable winter of 1838 and chronicles their troubles with the villagers. 

Chopin, Sand and her children are the main characters of the theater play by Polish writer Jarosław Iwaszkiewicz A Summer in Nohant, which premiered in 1930. The play, presenting the final stage of the writer-composer's relationship, was adapted five times by Polish Television: in 1963 (with Antonina Gordon-Górecka as Sand and Gustaw Holoubek as Chopin), in 1972 (with Halina Mikołajska and Leszek Herdegen), in 1980 (with Anna Polony and Michał Pawlicki), in 1999 (with Joanna Szczepkowska, who portrayed Solange in the 1980 version and Piotr Skiba) and in 2021 (with Katarzyna Herman and Marek Kossakowski).

In film 
George Sand is portrayed by Merle Oberon in A Song to Remember, by Patricia Morison in Song Without End, by Rosemary Harris in Notorious Woman, by Judy Davis in James Lapine's 1991 British-American film Impromptu; and by Juliette Binoche in the 1999 French film Children of the Century (Les Enfants du siècle). Also in George Who? (French: George qui?), a 1973 French biographical film directed by Michèle Rosier and starring Anne Wiazemsky as George Sand, Alain Libolt and Denis Gunsbourg. In the 2002 Polish film Chopin: Desire for Love directed by Jerzy Antczak George Sand is portrayed by Danuta Stenka. In the French film Flashback (2021 film) directed by Caroline Vigneaux, George Sand is portrayed by Suzanne Clément.

Works 

 Voyage en Auvergne (autobiographical sketch, 1827)
 Un hiver à Majorque (1842)
 Histoire de ma vie (Story of My Life) (autobiography up to the revolution of 1848; 1855)

Novels 
 Rose et Blanche (1831, with Jules Sandeau)
 Indiana (1832)
 Valentine (1832)
  (1833)
 Andréa (1833)
 Mattéa (1833)
 Jacques (1833)
 Kouroglou / Épopée Persane (1833)
 Leone Leoni (1833)
 André (1834)
 La Marquise (1834)
 Simon (1835)
 Mauprat (1837)
 Les Maîtres mosaïstes (The Master Mosaic Workers) (1837)
 L'Orco (1838)
 L'Uscoque (The Uscoque, or The Corsair) (1838)
  (1839)
  (1839)
 Horace (1840)
 Le Compagnon du tour de France (The Journeyman Joiner, or the Companion of the Tour of France) (1840)
 Consuelo (1842)
 La Comtesse de Rudolstadt (Countess of Rudolstadt) (1843, a sequel to Consuelo)
  (1844)
 Teverino (1845) (translated as Jealousy: Teverino)
 Le Péché de M. Antoine (The Sin of M. Antoine) (1845)
 Le Meunier d'Angibault (The Miller of Angibault) (1845)
 La Mare au Diable (The Devil's Pool) (1846)
 Lucrezia Floriani (1846)
 François le Champi (The Country Waif) (1847)
 La Petite Fadette (1849)
 Château des Désertes (1850)
 Histoire du véritable Gribouille (1851, translated as The Mysterious Tale of Gentle Jack and Lord Bumblebee)
 Les Maîtres sonneurs (The Bagpipers) (1853)
 Isidora (1853)
 La Daniella (1857)
 Les Beaux Messiers de Bois-Dore (The Gallant Lords of Bois-Dore or The Fine Gentlemen of Bois-Dore) (1857)
 Elle et Lui (She and He) (1859)
 Narcisse (1859)
 Jean de la Roche (1859)
 L'Homme de neige (The Snow Man) (1859)
 La Ville noire (The Black City) (1860)
 Marquis de Villemer (1860)
 Valvedre (1861)
 Antonia (1863)
 Mademoiselle La Quintinie (1863)
 Laura, Voyage dans le cristal (Laura, or Voyage into the Crystal) (1864)
 Monsieur Sylvestre (1866)
 Le Dernier Amour (1866, dedicated to Flaubert)
 Mademoiselle Merquem (1868)
 Pierre Qui Roule (A Rolling Stone) (1870)
 Le Beau Laurence (Handsome Lawrence) (1870, a sequel to Pierre Qui Roule)
 Malgretout (1870)
 Cesarine Dietrich (1871)
 Nanon (1872)
 Ma Sœur Jeanne (My Sister Jeannie) (1874)
 Flamarande (1875)
 Les Deux Frères (1875, a sequel to Flamarande)
  (1876)
 La Tour de Percemont (The Tower of Percemont) (1876)

Plays 
 Gabriel (1839)
 Cosima ou La haine dans l'amour (1840)
 Les Sept cordes de la lyre (translated as A Woman's Version of the Faust Legend: The Seven Strings of the Lyre) (1840)
 François le Champi (1849)
 Claudie (1851)
 Le Mariage de Victorine (1851)
 Le Pressoir (1853)
 French adaptation of As You Like It (1856)
 Le Pavé (1862, "The Paving Stone")
 Le Marquis de Villemer (1864)
 Le Lis du Japon (1866, "The Japanese Lily")
 L'Autre (1870, with Sarah Bernhardt)
 Un Bienfait n'est jamais perdu (1872, "A Good Deed Is Never Wasted")

Source:

See also 
 Elizabeth Ann Ashurst (translator)
 Pauline Viardot
 Saint-Benoît-du-Sault

References

Citations

General and cited sources 
 George Sand – Bicentennial Exhibition, Musée de la Vie romantique, Paris, 2004, curated by Jérôme Godeau. Contributions by Diane de Margerie, Yves Gagneux, Françoise Heilbrun, Isabelle Leroy-Jay Lemaistre, Claude Samuel, Arlette Sérullaz, Nicole Savy & Martine Reid.
 .
  (see "Writings by George Sand").
 .
 

In French:
 
 
 
 . Paintault, Micheline (Director); Cerf , Claudine (Author).

Further reading 

 Harlan, Elizabeth (2004). George Sand. New Haven: Yale University Press. .
 Jordan, Ruth, George Sand: a biography, London, Constable, 1976, .
 Parks, Tim, "Devils v. Dummies" (review of George Sand, La Petite Fadette, translated by Gretchen van Slyke, Pennsylvania State, 2017, 192 pp.; and Martine Reid, George Sand, translated by Gretchen van Slyke, Pennsylvania State, 2019, 280 pp.), London Review of Books, vol. 41, no. 10 (23 May 2019), pp. 31–32. The men that Sand loved,' Reid observes, 'all had a certain physical resemblance... fragile, slight and a bit reserved.' Unthreatening, in short. Above all, they were younger than her. Sandeau, Musset and then, for the nine years between 1838 and 1847, Chopin, were all six years her junior." (p. 32.)
 . Oscar Wilde dreams of George Sand and is invited to a soirée at Nohant.

External links 

 George Sand – a site in memory of the 200th anniversary of George Sand's birth 
 George Sand, her work in French free readable version  
 George Sand, her work in audio version 
 
 
 
 

 
1804 births
1876 deaths
19th-century French composers
19th-century French dramatists and playwrights
19th-century French novelists
19th-century French women writers
French bisexual writers
French LGBT writers
Frédéric Chopin
French women novelists
French socialists
Légion d'honneur refusals
People from Indre
Pseudonymous women writers
Writers from Paris
19th-century letter writers
19th-century pseudonymous writers